Neftegorsk is an urban locality (an urban-type settlement) in Apsheronsky District of Krasnodar Krai, Russia. Population:

References

Urban-type settlements in Krasnodar Krai
Apsheronsky District